Flag of Hamilton may refer to:
Flag of Hamilton, Bermuda
Flag of Hamilton, Ontario, Canada
Flag of Hamilton, New Zealand